Yang Chun-Song (born March 18, 1984) is a male freestyle wrestler from North Korea. He participated in Men's freestyle 66 kg at 2008 Summer Olympics. He was eliminated in the 1/8 of final losing with Albert Batyrov.

External links
 Wrestler bio on beijing2008.com
 
 

Living people
1984 births
Olympic wrestlers of North Korea
North Korean male sport wrestlers
Wrestlers at the 2008 Summer Olympics
Asian Games medalists in wrestling
Wrestlers at the 2010 Asian Games
Asian Games bronze medalists for North Korea
Medalists at the 2010 Asian Games
Asian Wrestling Championships medalists
21st-century North Korean people